Bharthana is a constituency of the Uttar Pradesh Legislative Assembly covering the city of Bharthana in the Etawah district of Uttar Pradesh, India.

Bharthana is one of five assembly constituencies in the Etawah Lok Sabha constituency. Since 2008, this assembly constituency is numbered 201 amongst 403 constituencies.

Election results

2022

2017
Bharatiya Janta Party candidate Savitri Katheria won in 2017 Uttar Pradesh Legislative Elections defeating Samajwadi Party candidate Kamlesh Kumar Katheria by a margin of 	1,968 votes.

References

External links
 

Assembly constituencies of Uttar Pradesh
Etawah district